Sciaphila is a genus of mycoheterotrophic plants in the family Triuridaceae. These plants receive nutrition from fungi and neighboring trees and have less need for photosynthesis. It is widespread in tropical and subtropical regions, found in Africa, China, Japan, the Indian Subcontinent, Southeast Asia, Latin America (from southern Mexico to Brazil) and on various islands Pacific Islands.

Species
Many species names have been proposed, including some for taxa now transferred to other genera. The following are accepted as member of Sciaphila:

 Sciaphila africana A.Chev. - Ghana, Ivory Coast, Congo-Brazzaville,
 Sciaphila albescens Benth. - Brazil, Colombia, Venezuela, Panama, the Guianas
 Sciaphila aneitensis Hemsl. - Vanuatu, Futuna, Niue
 Sciaphila arcuata Aver. - Vietnam
 Sciaphila arfakiana Becc. - Taiwan, Philippines, Malaysia, Indonesia, New Guinea, Micronesia, Fiji, Bismarck Archipelago, Solomon Islands
 Sciaphila consimilis Blume - Taiwan, Philippines
 Sciaphila corallophyton K.Schum. & Schltr. in K.M.Schumann & C.A.G.Lauterbach - Pohnpei, New Caledonia, New Guinea, Bismarck Archipelago
 Sciaphila corniculata Becc. - Maluku, New Guinea, New Caledonia, Solomon Islands
 Sciaphila corymbosa Benth. - Brazil, Colombia
 Sciaphila densiflora Schltr. - Borneo, Lesser Sunda Islands, Philippines, New Guinea, New Caledonia, Maluku
 Sciaphila janthina (Champ.) Thwaites - Sri Lanka, southern India
 Sciaphila japonica Makino - Japan
 Sciaphila jianfenglingensis Han Xu, Y.D.Li & H.Q.Chen - Hainan
 Sciaphila khasiana Benth. & Hook.f. - Assam
 Sciaphila ledermannii Engl. - Nigeria, Cameroon, Gabon, Equatorial Guinea, São Tomé and Príncipe
 Sciaphila micranthera Giesen in H.G.A.Engler  - Borneo
 Sciaphila multiflora Giesen in H.G.A.Engler - Ryukyu Islands, Caroline Islands, Mindanao, New Guinea
 Sciaphila nana Blume - Jeju-do Island, Ryukyu Islands, Volcano Islands, Japan, Philippines, Thailand, Vietnam, Malaysia, Java, Sumatra
 Sciaphila oligantha Maas - State of Amazonas in Brazil
 Sciaphila papillosa Becc - New Guinea
 Sciaphila picta Miers - Yucatán Peninsula, Central America, Colombia, Venezuela
 Sciaphila polygyna Maas - Colombia, French Guiana
 Sciaphila purpurea Benth. - Brazil, Venezuela, Guyana, Colombia, Ecuador, Peru 
 Sciaphila quadribullifera J.J.Sm. - New Guinea
 Sciaphila ramosa Fukuy. & T.Suzuki - Hong Kong, Taiwan, Bonin Islands
 Sciaphila rubra Maas - Brazil, Venezuela
 Sciaphila schwackeana Johow  - Brazil
 Sciaphila secundiflora Thwaites ex Benth. - China, Japan, Bonin Islands, Philippines, Malaysia, Borneo, Sumatra, New Guinea, Bismarck Archipelago, Solomon Islands, Sri Lanka
 Sciaphila stellata Aver. - Guangxi, Vietnam
 Sciaphila sugimotoi Suetsugu & T.Nishioka - Japan
 Sciaphila tenella Blume - Sri Lanka, Kyushu, southern China, Thailand, Borneo, Sumatra, Malaysia, Java, Sulawesi, Maluku, New Guinea, Bismarck Archipelago, Solomon Islands
 Sciaphila thaidanica K.Larsen - Thailand
 Sciaphila wariana (Schltr.) Meerend - Papua New Guinea
 Sciaphila winkleri Schltr. - Borneo, New Guinea
 Sciaphila yakushimensis Suetsugu - Yakushima

References

Pandanales genera
Parasitic plants
Triuridaceae